Jehangir Institute of Psychiatry is a hospital located in Latifabad suburb of the city of Hyderabad, in Sindh, Pakistan. It was established in 1852 during the British Raj and was named after Jehangir Cowasji Jehangir Readymoney. It is the largest psychiatric hospital in Pakistan. It is locally known as Giddu Bandar Mental Hospital.

References

Psychiatric hospitals in Pakistan
Hospitals in Hyderabad, Sindh
Hospital buildings completed in 1852
1852 establishments in British India
Hospitals established in 1852